Harrison McAllister Randall (December 17, 1870 – November 10, 1969) was an American physicist whose leadership from 1915 to 1941 brought the University of Michigan to international prominence in experimental and theoretical physics.

Biography
Randall was born in Burr Oak, Michigan on December 17, 1870. His family then moved to Ann Arbor, where he spent his formative years and most of his life. He graduated from the Ann Arbor High School (now Pioneer High School) in 1889, and then earned his bachelor's degree in physics from the University of Michigan in 1893. A year later he completed a master's degree, then spent a few years teaching in high schools in West Bay City and Saginaw, living with his girlfriend Ida Muma who had a degree in classical studies from Michigan.

On August 24, 1898 he married Ida, then in 1899 he returned to the University of Michigan to work as an instructor and finish his doctorate. He completed his PhD in physics in 1902, and immediately took a position on the faculty of the University, where he remained for the next 38 years.

In 1910 Randall moved abroad to work under Professor Friedrich Paschen at the University of Tübingen—55 years before Tübingen and Ann Arbor would become sister cities. This was shortly after Paschen had discovered what is now called the Paschen series in the spectrum of hydrogen, and about 20 years after the discovery of what is now called Paschen's Law of electrical discharges. Randall said that he knew nothing about spectroscopy at the time and Paschen simply handed him a spectrometer and expected him to get to work—which he ultimately did. Even to the end of his life Randall considered Paschen his greatest mentor.

Prior to 1910, the Michigan Physics Department had focused on precision metrology. Dr. Randall, who took all of his degrees at Michigan, initially specialized in that subject.  In 1902, his PhD thesis measured the coefficient of expansion of quartz. During his 1910-11 sabbatical year in Tübingen, Germany he met Friedrich Paschen and became an expert in infrared spectroscopy.  Quantum mechanics did not yet exist as a field, and the study of atomic spectra was largely ad hoc experimentation with very little theoretical underpinning. This was also the training Randall received as a young physicist. But Randall came home from his 1910 sabbatical at Tübingen with new ideas (as well as some new equipment Paschen had helped him develop), and went on to lead a radical overhaul of physics research at Michigan.

Theoretical physics
Randall and his Michigan collaborators produced molecular spectra of unprecedented quality and detail. At that time Walter Colby was the only resident theorist, so, with Randall’s encouragement, Colby recruited Oskar Klein. Although Klein returned to Europe after two years, the importance of theoretical colleagues was established.  Subsequently, the University of Michigan added Otto Laporte, Samuel Goudsmit, George Uhlenbeck and David Dennison to the physics faculty. Colby and Randall also started the Michigan Summer Symposia in Theoretical Physics, an annual, multi-week gathering that occurred from 1927 to 1941.  This conference provided short courses from prominent theorists, including Bohr, Dirac, Fermi, Heisenberg, Pauli and others, to audiences that sometimes exceeded 100.

Administration

One of Randall's central changes was to spend more resources on theorists as well as experimentalists, including a controversial program in which theoretical physicists would get a sabbatical every two years to work with theoretical physicists in Europe. At the time most of the best theoretical physics was being done in Europe, and it was partly through Randall's leadership that top-notch theoretical physics came to the United States.

Randall was very persuasive when it came to securing funding; despite resistance from deans and presidents he managed to add on several new faculty as well as commission the construction of the East Physics Building (which is now named Randall Laboratory in his honor). The University refused to fund the high salaries necessary for renowned researchers, but Randall's strategy was to start with lesser-known researchers and help them develop into top researchers later on.

Career

Randall oversaw Michigan’s substantial growth in atomic physics and nuclear physics.  In the mid-1930s he secured funding to build what was then the world's most energetic cyclotron.

From 1917 to 1919 Randall was a researcher at the National Bureau of Standards. In 1925 Randall became vice-president of the American Association for the Advancement of Science. Randall was President of the American Physical Society in 1937, and remained Chair of the Physics Department at the same time, until he "retired" in 1941—only to go on and extend his previous work in infrared spectroscopy to biophysics. In 1956 he received an honorary degree from Ohio State University and in 1966 he received an honorary Doctor of Law degree from the University of Michigan as well.

Harrison Randall died on November 10, 1969 at the age of 98.

Personality

In interviews, Randall displayed a complex mix of humility—often downplaying his own substantial accomplishments—and bitterness over what he felt were his ideas stolen by other researchers, particularly his students who went on to publish more prominently than he ever did.

Despite his skills in leadership and many acquaintances (some of them world-renowned physicists), Randall had a difficult time making close friends. He considered his wife Ida to be his closest friend and most important source of emotional support.

References

Publications
 
   (this is a refinement of his 1902 thesis experiment)
  (overview of work in Ann Arbor)
    (Ives medal encomium for Harrison M. Randall)
 
   (example of work done after his retirement)
 

1870 births
1969 deaths
University of Michigan faculty
American physicists
University of Michigan College of Literature, Science, and the Arts alumni
People from St. Joseph County, Michigan
People from Ann Arbor, Michigan
Presidents of the American Physical Society